The 1955–56 Duke Blue Devils men's basketball team represented Duke University in the 1955–56 NCAA men's basketball season. The head coach was Harold Bradley and the team finished the season with an overall record of 19–7.

References 

Duke Blue Devils men's basketball seasons
Duke
1955 in sports in North Carolina
1956 in sports in North Carolina